Nilphamari Medical College is a public medical school in Nilphamari, Bangladesh. The class of the first batch of 50 students was commenced on January 10, 2019, on its temporary campus of Nilphamari Sadar Hospital.

See also
 List of medical colleges in Bangladesh

References

Medical colleges in Bangladesh
Hospitals in Bangladesh
Nilphamari District